The Division of Higinbotham was an Australian Electoral Division in Victoria. The division was created in 1949 and abolished in 1969, when it was renamed Hotham. It was named for George Higinbotham, a leading Victorian colonial politician and judge. It was located in 
the south-eastern suburbs of Melbourne, including Bentleigh, Highett, Moorabbin and Sandringham. It was a fairly safe seat for the Liberal Party.

Members

Election results

Higinbotham